"Winter Song" is a song performed by English musician Sam Fender. The song was released as a digital download on 24 November 2020 by Polydor Records and was used to raise money for Big Issue. It is a cover of a 1970 track by Lindisfarne.

Background

Lyric video
A lyric video to accompany the release of "Winter Song" was first released onto YouTube on 24 November 2020. Talking about the video, Fender said, "So we got together with People Of The Streets [...] and I think it's sort of the first time you get to see the perspective of homeless people. You hear stats and statistics and you see the figures and it's horrible, but you don't actually see the human side of it. When you watch the video it's stunning and I was choking up the first time that I watched it. It's human and it makes it a lot more personal and a lot more close to home."

Personnel
Credits adapted from Tidal.

 Bramwell Bronte – Producer, engineer, mixer, studio personnel
 Alan Hull – Composer, lyricist
 India Bourne – Associated Performer, cello
 Sam Fender – Associated Performer, piano, vocals
 Robin Schmidt – Mastering Engineer, studio personnel

Charts

Release history

References

Sam Fender songs
2020 songs